Michael Collins is an American former amateur boxer from Texas who was a silver medalist at both the 1982 World Amateur Boxing Championships and 1987 Pan American Games.

Collins was beaten by eventual 1984 Olympic gold medalist Steve McCrory in the flyweight final of the US Olympic trials, before moving up to the bantamweight division. As a three-time national bantamweight champion, Collins entered the 1988 Olympic trials as the favourite, but fell in the semi-finals to Kennedy McKinney, who also went on to win Olympic gold.

References

Year of birth missing (living people)
Living people
American male boxers
AIBA World Boxing Championships medalists
Pan American Games medalists in boxing
Pan American Games silver medalists for the United States
Boxers at the 1987 Pan American Games
Bantamweight boxers
Flyweight boxers
Boxers from Texas
Medalists at the 1987 Pan American Games